Marylebone Boys' School is a free school set up by parents, teachers and local people of Marylebone in Central London. It opened on Wednesday 3 September 2014  in temporary accommodation   in Priory Park Road, London NW6 7UJ, but later moved to a permanent site in North Wharf Road, near Paddington Station.

The secondary school is for boys aged 11 – 16 years, then there is a co-educational Sixth Form, 200 metres away for young adults aged 16 – 18 years.

History & Location 
The main school building was opened in 2014 as a new, purpose-built secondary school, with a separate Sixth Form Centre opened in November 2021.

The school was inspected by Ofsted in 2017 and judged to be Good.

GCSE Results 
75 per cent of the pupils received a grade 5-9 in English and Math, 27 per cent of all grades awarded were 9 or 8, 43 per cent of all grades awarded were 9-7. In English, 88 per cent of pupils were awarded a 9-5 grade, In Maths, 82 per cent of pupils were awarded a 9-5 grade, In Science, 76 per cent of pupils were awarded a 9-5 grade.

Notable People 
The Marylebone Boys’ School Chair of Governors is Margaret Mountford.

References

External links
 

Boys' schools in London
Educational institutions established in 2014
Free schools in London
Secondary schools in the City of Westminster
2014 establishments in England